WXLC is an FM radio station that operates on the 102.3 MHz frequency, based in Waukegan, Illinois. The format is currently hot adult contemporary and its owned by Alpha Media. WXLC broadcasts throughout Lake County, Illinois and Kenosha County, Wisconsin.  WXLC also penetrates the Illinois counties of Cook and McHenry in addition to Racine County in Wisconsin as well. The station's transmitter is in Waukegan, while its studios are based in the north end of the Gurnee Mills mall in Gurnee.

History
The station began broadcasting in May 1963 and held the call sign WEFA. In 1980, the station's call sign was changed to WXLC, which stands for "Across Lake County". The X illustrates "across." Its 2 towers are clearly visible on Route 120, east of US 41. WXLC was also used on US Cable Channel Guide, Lake County's only original Electronic Prevue Guide.

WXLC was an affiliate of Dan Ingram's Top 40 Satellite Survey in the mid 1980s, an affiliate of The Rockin' America Top 30 Countdown with Scott Shannon in the late 1980s and early 1990s, and an affiliate of American Top 40 with Shadoe Stevens in the early 1990s.

Many Chicago area radio personalities and other DJs nationwide can trace their careers back to WXLC at one time or another. Nick Farella (1948–2005) was a Chicago broadcaster (WMAQ) as well as a longtime Program Director at the station.

For many years, WXLC was known as "Hot 102.3 FM."

On March 20, 2023 WXLC rebranded as "Star 102.3".

Previous logo

References

External links
WXLC Website

Waukegan, Illinois
Hot adult contemporary radio stations in the United States
Radio stations established in 1963
XLC
1963 establishments in Illinois
Alpha Media radio stations